Heins is a surname. Notable people with the surname include:

Christopher Heins (died 1689), lieutenant and interim Governor-General of The Danish West Indies during two short periods
Donald Heins (1878–1949), Canadian violinist, violist, conductor, organist, composer, and music educator of English birth
Henry Hardy Heins (1923–2003), American Lutheran minister, historian and bibliographer
Julie Heins (1822–1902), Danish writer
Marjorie Heins, activist, writer, and founder of the Free Expression Policy Project
Maurice Heins (1915–2015), American mathematician
Ryan Heins (born 1985), American soccer player
Shawn Heins (born 1973), professional ice hockey player
Thorsten Heins (born 1957), German telecommunications executive; current CEO of BlackBerry (formerly known as Research In Motion)

See also
Heins & LaFarge, architect George Lewis Heins (1860–1907) and Christopher Grant LaFarge (1862–1938)